Richard Epp may refer to:
 Richard Epp (physicist), Canadian physicist
 Richard Epp (actor), Canadian playwright and actor

See also
Richard Eppes, planter and surgeon